Craig Hill is a mountain located in the Catskill Mountains of New York east-southeast of Delhi. Calhoun Hill is located east, Bryden Mountain is located north, and Scotch Mountain is located west-northwest of Craig Hill.

References

Mountains of Delaware County, New York
Mountains of New York (state)